Events during the year 2005 in Italy.

Incumbents
President: Carlo Azeglio Ciampi 
Prime Minister: Silvio Berlusconi

Events  
7 January – Crevalcore train crash 
24 October – Eurostar 9410 derailment

Deaths  

9 January – Artidoro Berti, long-distance runner (b. 1920).
10 January – Margherita Carosio, soprano (b. 1908).
11 January – Fabrizio Meoni, off-road and rallying motorcycle racer (b. 1957).
1 March – Sergio Campanato, mathematician (b. 1930). 
15 March – Renzo Alverà, bobsledder (b. 1933).
17 June – Susanna Javicoli, actress (b. 1954).
13 August – Wladimiro Calarese, fencer (b. 1930).
16 August – Tonino Delli Colli, cinematographer (b. 1923).
1 October  Renzo Nostini, fencer (b. 1914).
16 December – Enzo Stuarti, tenor (b. 1919).

References 

 
2000s in Italy
Years of the 21st century in Italy
Italy
Italy